KOLU (90.1 FM) is a radio station broadcasting a Conservative Christian radio format. Licensed to Pasco, Washington, United States, the station is currently owned by First Baptist Church of Riverview.

References

External links

OLU
Radio stations established in 1966
1966 establishments in Washington (state)